Germ or germs may refer to:

Science 
 Germ (microorganism), an informal word for a pathogen
 Germ cell, cell that gives rise to the gametes of an organism that reproduces sexually
 Germ layer, a primary layer of cells that forms during embryonic development
 Cereal germ, the reproductive part of a cereal grain 
 Tooth germ, an aggregation of cells that eventually forms a tooth
 Germ theory of disease, which states that some diseases are caused by microorganisms
 Germ (mathematics), an object in a topological space that captures local properties

Art and media

Music 
 Germs (band), an American punk rock band
 Germ (musician), a stage name of Tim Wright
 Germ (rapper), an American rapper affiliated with Suicideboys and Pouya
 "Germs" (song), by "Weird Al" Yankovic
 The Germ (album), by Victim's Family

Others
 "Germs" (Invader Zim), an episode of Invader Zim
 The Germ (periodical), a British art magazine published in 1850
 The Germs (comics), a comic strip
 "The Germ", an episode of G.I. Joe: A Real American Hero

Other uses 
 Germ, Hautes-Pyrénées, a commune in the Hautes-Pyrénées department of southwestern France
 Germ Hofma (born 1925), Dutch football player in the 1940s and 1950s

See also 
 Germination, the process by which an organism grows from a seed or similar structure
 Stem cell, biological cells that can differentiate into other types of cells
Germans, people from Germany